Bieńkowice  (German Benkowitz) is a village in the administrative district of Gmina Krzyżanowice, within Racibórz County, Silesian Voivodeship, in southern Poland, close to the Czech border.

The village has a population of 1,200.

Gallery

References

Villages in Racibórz County